Maurette is both a surname and given name. The surname is of French origin, meaning "Moor" or "Moorish". Notable people with the surname or given name include:

Surname
Marcelle Maurette (1903–1972), French playwright and screenwriter
Marie-Thérèse Maurette (1890–1989), French educator
Victoria Maurette (born 1982), Argentine actress, musician, singer, songwriter, and composer

Given name
Maurette Brown Clark (born 1966), American gospel musician